Hanging Dog Creek is a stream in the U.S. state of North Carolina. It is a tributary to the Hiwassee River.

Some say the name Hanging Dog is a corruption of "Hanging Maw", a local Cherokee, while others believe the name stems from an incident when Indian's dog was "hung up" in river debris before being rescued.

References

Rivers of North Carolina
Tributaries of the Hiwassee River
Rivers of Cherokee County, North Carolina